Ior Bock (originally Bror Holger Svedlin; 17 January 1942 – 23 October 2010) was a Swedish-speaking Finnish tour guide, actor, mythologist and eccentric. Bock was a colourful media personality and became a very popular tour guide at the island fortress of Suomenlinna, where he worked from 1973 to 1998.

In 1984, Bock raised public interest and discussion when he claimed that his family line (Boxström) had been keepers of an ancient folklore tradition that provides insight into the pagan culture of Finland, including hitherto unknown autofellatio exercises connected to old fertility rites. These stories are often known as the Bock saga. His eccentric philosophical and mythological theories gained a small international following.

Biography

Birth
According to Bock's autobiographical The Bock Saga, he was born as the result of an incestuous relationship between sea-captain Knut Victor Boxström (1860–1942), who would have been 81 years old at the time, and his daughter Rhea, 42. Knut's only son had been killed in the Finnish Civil War in 1918, and this was a desperate measure to continue the male line and bring the extensive family-saga about heathen times to the public eye. Knut Victor Boxström died shortly after Ior's baptism, one month after his birth. Consequently, he was adopted by Rhea's husband, Bror Gustaf Bertil Svedlin.

In 2004, the freelance journalist Magnus Londen published an article where he claimed that Ior Bock was actually an adopted son of Rhea Boxström-Svedlin and Bror Svedlin. According to Londen, official adoption documents in the National Archive in Helsinki prove that Ior's biological mother was a 23 years old gardening instructor in Porvoo. His father was said to be a Spanish sailor. After Bock's death, a family friend from Sibbo, quoting her mother, supported the adoption claims. In 2003, Bock had answered Londen's queries by explaining that the adoption-theme was a necessary precaution from his mother to hide the incestuous act that led to his birth.

Adolescence
According to Magnus Londen's article, young Holger Svedlin was sent off to an orphanage for one year at age nine. Londen, citing unnamed acquaintances of the Svedlin family, states that Holger (who had adopted the name Ior, meaning Eeyore in Swedish) had displayed irrational behaviour and that his mother had been unable to cope with him since his adopted father had died the previous year. It was during this period that, according to the stories he later told, his twenty years of daily training into the sound system and secret saga of his family began. It was his biological mother as well as his aunt/sister Rachel who taught him for two hours every day, and only when they were away was he in the orphanage.

At the age of 15, he went into training practice as a lighting technician at Svenska Teatern (The Swedish Theatre) in Helsinki. Here he completed his basic education to become a professional actor at age 21.

Shooting death of his brother
In 1962 Ior Svedlin's adopted brother, Erik Svedlin, died by a gunshot at the age of 23. Due to his participation in the situation that led to the death, Ior received a probation of four months, on the grounds of "participation in acts that led to involuntary manslaughter". After his parents' death, Ior Bock (as he was known by then) stated that Erik Svedlin actually committed suicide due to a family drama – as his planned marriage was disapproved of by his family. Erik's fiancé as well as friends have disputed this claim in interviews with Londen. According to Ior Bock's version, to avoid a social scandal, the incident was termed an "accidental death" and explained to be a result of the two brothers "playing around". According to Magnus Londen, the investigation report in the police archive in Helsinki states that the brothers had been listening to music while Ior was dancing and playing with a gun. Ior told the police that the gun went off accidentally when he threw it to his brother. Everyone involved considered the incident to be an accident.

Professional life and publicity
According to Magnus Londen, the stories told by Ior Svedlin during his guided tours gradually evolved in a bizarre direction, resulting in a conflict with his employer. From 1984 to 1998 he continued his studies of Sveaborg while guiding on a free-lance basis, using his new name Ior Bock.

Starting in the mid-1970s, Bockström-Svedlin started regularly visiting the well-known hippie paradise Goa on the Arabian Sea coast of India. Every year from October to April he stayed in the small village Chapora, developing a significant crowd of supporters, or apprentices as some back in Finland would call them. According to Londen, Ior Svedlin was interviewed by the Finnish newspaper Hufvudstadsbladet in 1982 and he was quoted there giving a statement that Londen has found most poignant in yielding a critical perspective on Ior Bock's own biography which he began to present to the public two years thereafter.

Excavation of the Temple of Lemminkäinen

In 1987, Ior Bock and his supporters began fund-raising in order to finance excavation of a sediment-filled cave that is situated under the hill 'Sibbosberg', situated north of Gumbostrand in Sipoo, 30 km east of Helsinki – at the estate Bock had inherited from his parents. The cave was supposed to lead to a furnished temple-chamber inside the Sibbosberg, known as the Temple of Lemminkäinen. Inside of the temple chamber, a spiraling hallway is described, with small hall-rooms that were created to hold the collected treasures from each generation from the heathen culture of ancient Finland. The time of ongoing storage is counted in millennia, accumulating a large treasure chamber. The last storage was done in 987 when the entrance-hall was filled and the entrance-door closed and hidden, as foreign warlords would enter the Baltic area and - by the year 1050 - reaching and conquering the major cities of southern Finland.

A number of digs in the cave were made on various occasions during 1987–1998.

Due to the enigmatic statements of the family-saga, The National Board of Antiquities in Finland retracted from involving themselves with the hallway inside the Sibbo Mountain as an archaeological site. The participation of professional archaeologists in the Gumbo excavations has been restricted into a couple of official visits, during which nothing archaeologically significant was observed. In a recent archaeological survey, the Gumbo cave was defined as a natural formation of geological interest. According to the surveying archaeologist, the only man-made feature there is a recent rock carving.

In 1990, police arrested Bock and 33 other participants in the dig on suspicion of the use and distribution of Indian hemp. When the court sentenced three of Bock's foreign companions the results were a public scandal and the withdrawal of the sponsor of the excavation, the major construction company Lemminkäinen Group. Since then, smaller digs have been made. In 1999, a stabbing left Bock quadriplegic. When Bock was still in hospital, his debts to the Lemminkäinen Group and a geotechnical contractor (from 1992) were used to instigate a process against him for debts and credits. During Bock's stay in Goa the following winter, his assets were confiscated and his properties sold.

Hoard of the Kajaani castle
Another location of Bock's stories was the early 17th century stone fort in Kajaani. According to Bock, a castle was situated in the place already in the 13th century, when a royal treasure of kings of Finland, including a golden buck statue, was hidden in a well in the courtyard of the castle. Some excitement arose when ground-penetrating radar investigations made in 1996 and 2000 suggested that a sizable metal item was located at 4 meters depth of the courtyard of the fort. According to the state archaeologist Henrik Lilius the item was probably an old cannon that could have fallen into the well during the destruction of the fort in 1716. A new investigation made in 2006 was not able to verify the earlier observations. During an archaeological excavation made later in 2006, it was noticed that an electric ground cable had been dug in the courtyard at 40 cm depth. According to the project manager Selja Flink of the National Board of Antiquities, it was most probably the object noticed in the ground-penetrating radar investigations. According to Flink, there is no archaeological or documentary evidence of the well mentioned by Bock.

Death
On 23 October 2010, Bock was stabbed to death in his apartment in Helsinki. Police arrested two men, Indian nationals aged 19 and 28, who had shared his apartment and had worked as his personal assistants.

The younger suspect was subsequently set free and cleared of all charges. The 28-year-old was found not culpable by reason of insanity and in 2011 he was deported to India.

Outline of the Bock Saga
At her funeral on 23 June 1984, Ior claimed that his mother Rhea (Boxström-Svedlin) had left him a very specific duty, confirmed in her will; to bring their ancient and unknown family-saga to the attention of professional historians as well as the public. The first recordings were done in Swedish in 1984 and 1985 at The Archive of Folklore in Helsinki. Later he gave further outlines and specifics in numerous tapes and in 1996 the Finnish writer Juha Javanainen collected some basic extracts in the book Bockin Perheen Saga (Helsinki, 1996).

In his saga, Bock employs a distinct etymology, based on the letters of the Scandinavian alphabets (Swedish and Finnish language). To support his (allegedly) historical saga he related it to old Scandinavian folklore, describing a nucleus that is supposed to be the origin of both the Scandinavian and the Finnish cultures. The saga describes a detailed sound system, built on the sounds of the Scandinavian alphabet. Based on this phonology the saga explains an extensive mythology and a chronological, stringent history. The "historical outline" covers a number of topics; from the origin of man before Ice Age and a global caste-system, to the breakup of this global population due to the appearance of the Ice Age, climatic fluctuations and continental drift. The saga explains how this first, tropical culture was divided into ten different kingdoms as life on each continents developed into parallel but different biotops. During the eons of time when ice time proceeded a small group of people, the Aser, who were caught inside the ice of northern Europe – inside the Baltic Ocean. The end of Ice Age broke this isolation and became a "new start" of humanity since all the various populations could now be reached – and reach each other. Regaining contact with the various tropical kingdoms the Aser were instrumental in spreading a "root-system" of words, to develop a common ground for communication and exchange between the various cultures. Since the legendary "deluge" (Younger Dryas) 10,000 years ago, the connections rapidly established and similar cultures started on all the different continents, leading to parallel cultures on the respective continents, leading to the ethnicities, constitutions and civilizations we know as Stone Age and Classical Antiquity.

During these millennia, the Asers were drafting and cultivating their intercontinental connections, enhancing the exchange of knowledge, skills and produce worldwide. The purpose was to produce common features and grounds for language and culture, through the exchange of procreators, skills, crafts, arts and architecture. Their method was co-operation between parallel constitutions of royals, nobilities and laymen. According to the saga the Eurasian monarchies were established shortly after the Ice Age. From the one arctic group of people that survived Ice Age, called "Aser", only three families were first made to explore the Eurasian north – and leave offspring in their respective regions; east, west and south of the Baltic Ocean. These offspring became the core-families of three major kingdoms, who managed to grow into the societies that managed to populate western, central and eastern Europe. Within the open lands of northern Eurasia, the royals were producing 'houses' of nobility to inhabit and populate the various regions and there found a third cast of offspring, called Earls, to produce structured societies within their respective shires and villages.

The Bock saga explains that the historical kingdoms of Eurasia descended from the three kingdoms found by the Aser already during early Stone Age. Similar constitutions are claimed to have existed already in the southern hemisphere, on all other continents. Since the ancestry of all these tropical and arctic royals would lead back to a common source, the word "All-father" was recognized by them all as a common origin of all human beings. Thus the renewed contact and resurrection of common roots and goals resulted in a positive contact and exchange, producing a worldwide net of genetic and academic exchange – leading to the innovations, produce and trade of agriculture, metals and alloys that led to advanced arts, tools, craft and technology.

A major theme in the poetry and prose of the Bock saga is the exposure of the ancient fertility cultures of antiquity, whose legal traditions – based on inheritance – where contradictory to the interest of foreign invaders and illegal regimes. Consequently, to handle an occupied population, the religions of the Middle Ages exercised an absolute repression of all the old fertility rituals, since they required and recreated the memory of the old codexes. Consequently, the heathen traditions of sexual visibility and identification was massively condemned and sanctioned with the most severe of punishments. One such heathen tradition was that of drinking the "divine vine" or the "water of wisdom", which literally refers to the female sap (ejaculate) and the male sperm.

According to the saga the pagan traditions were based on a naturalistic philosophy, where it was regarded a virtue to "save and not spill ones semen or female ejaculate". This could be done by sharing the liquids in a "69" or by practicing autofellatio – which the family-saga names sauna-solmu. The Finnish expression for this "sacred vines" would be Viisauden Vesi—the water of wisdom, which in other traditions are known under cryptic terms such as "The Water of Life", "The Seeds of Life", "The Nectar of The Gods" or "The Elixir of the Blessed". In the early Christian context these classical issues were mistranslated, to "blood" and "flesh", to stigmatize the pagan peoples as wild beasts, vampires and cannibals. Paradoxically, the liturgy is still defining "the flesh and blood of Jesus" as our most sacred rite, the communion. Even if the tools of the communion today are explained to be "purely allegorical" their origin are still to be explained. In fact however, origins of the communion are well known, the communion has little in common with mentioned traditions, and in Catholicism it is not allegorical.

While the men would learn how to "curl up" in a "sauna-knot" and drink directly from their "clubs", the women would normally ingest their mahla, female ejaculation, with a straw. According to the Bock Saga this used to be a collective tradition amongst men and women, where "heart-friends" (of the same sex) would share each other's liquids as a special favor and sacrament, to enhance their respective fertility and vitalize their neurological energy. The saga claims that within the heathen cultures this recycling of sperm and sap was obligatory at the age of 7, when it was combined with yoga exercises.

In popular culture
In 1994, Kingston Wall, a Finnish psychedelic rock group included the core of Bock's mythic symbolism on their last album, Tri-Logy. The saga was described in the CD booklet and some of the song lyrics featured themes from it.

References

Further reading
 Bock, Ior. Bockin perheen saaga : Väinämöisen mytologia. Synchronicity. 1996
 Londen, Magnus. . https://www.magnuslonden.net/fi/artikkelit/haastattelut/article-64846-28436-holgerin-saaga-alias-ior-bockin-tarina. Luettu 30. joulukuuta 2021
 Javanainen, Juha. Ior Bockin yhteistyö Ehrensvärd-seuran kanssa. iorbock.fi. Luettu 1. syyskuuta 2006
 Kirkkoherra kielsi muinaistarujen jumalien muistotulet. Helsingin Sanomat. Kesäkuu 1884.
 Lipponen, Ulla. SKSÄ 375–376. 1984. Nauhoitettu 2.10.1984 Helsinki. Kertoja Ior Svedlin.
 Valtteri Väkevä: "Missä hän on nyt". Helsingin Sanomat/Kuukausiliite, 2007, nro Kesäkuu, s. 86.
 Heydemann, Klaus. Filmography – Klaus Heydemann. talvi.com. Luettu 8. toukokuuta 2007
 Similä, Ville: Näin puhui guru. Helsingin Sanomat, 8. lokakuuta 2004. Sanoma Osakeyhtiö. Artikkelin verkkoversio Viitattu 2.9.2007.

External links
  Bock Saga Website Official Bock Saga Website
  IorBock.fi – Official Website
  BockSaga.de – English and German
  BockSaga.no
 Bocksaga channel at YouTube

Films
  "Who in the Hel Is Ior Bock?" – (Documentary, 2018)
  "Bock Saga: Welcome to Hel" – (Documentary, 2015)
  "Bock Saga: Welcome to Rajasthan" – (Documentary, 2016)
  "Bock Saga: Welcome to Altlantis" – (Documentary, 2016)
  "Back to Lemminkäinen" – (Documentary series, Season 1, 2020)

1942 births
2010 deaths
Finnish victims of crime
Finnish mythology
Finnish people with disabilities
Male actors from Helsinki
People with tetraplegia
Place of birth missing
Storytellers
Swedish-speaking Finns
Tour guides
People murdered in Finland
Finnish murder victims
Deaths by stabbing in Finland
Finnish adoptees
Finnish people of Spanish descent